Same-sex marriage in South Carolina has been legal since a federal court order took effect on November 20, 2014. Another court ruling on November 18 had ordered the state to recognize same-sex marriages from other jurisdictions. Following the 2014 ruling of the Fourth Circuit Court of Appeals in Bostic v. Schaefer, which found Virginia's ban on same-sex marriage unconstitutional and set precedent on every state in the circuit, one judge accepted marriage license applications from same-sex couples until the South Carolina Supreme Court, in response to a request by the Attorney General, ordered him to stop. A federal district court ruled South Carolina's ban on same-sex marriage unconstitutional on November 12, with implementation of that decision stayed until noon on November 20. The first same-sex wedding ceremony was held on November 19.

Legal history

Restrictions
In 1996, the South Carolina House of Representatives, by a vote of 82 to 0, passed a statute defining marriage as "between one man and one woman". The South Carolina Senate passed the bill on a voice vote, and Governor David Beasley signed it into law.

On March 1, 2005, the House of Representatives approved Amendment 1, a constitutional amendment banning same-sex marriage and any "lawful domestic union", by a vote of 96 to 3. On April 13, 2005, the Senate passed the amendment by a vote of 42 to 1, and on November 7, 2006, South Carolina voters approved the amendment. Constitutional amendments in South Carolina need to be approved by two-thirds of each house of the General Assembly, approved by the people in an election, and then ratified by a majority of each house of the Assembly. On January 25, 2007, the House of Representatives ratified the amendment 92 to 7, and on February 27, 2007 the Senate voted 41–1 to ratify the amendment.

Lawsuits

Bradacs v. Haley
On August 28, 2013, Tracie Goodwin and Katie Bradacs, who had married in the District of Columbia in April 2012 and were raising three children, filed a lawsuit, Bradacs v. Haley, in the U.S. District Court for the District of South Carolina, challenging the state statute and constitutional amendment that denied legal recognition to same-sex marriages established in other jurisdictions. The plaintiffs were a state highway patrol officer and a disabled veteran of the U.S. Air Force. They named Governor Nikki Haley and Attorney General Alan Wilson as defendants. The case was initially assigned to U.S. District Judge Joseph F. Anderson, but was reassigned to Judge J. Michelle Childs on October 18, 2013. On April 22, 2014, Judge Childs stayed proceedings in Bradacs until the Fourth Circuit Court of Appeals ruled on the Virginia case of Bostic v. Schaefer, but she allowed briefing to continue.

Bostic v. Schaefer was resolved in favor of same-sex marriage on October 6, 2014, with the decision of the U.S. Supreme Court not to hear an appeal in the case, leaving Bostic as binding precedent on federal courts in South Carolina. Attorney General Wilson announced the same day that he would continue to defend the state's same-sex marriage ban in Bradacs. Judge Childs then lifted the stay of proceedings in Bradacs. The plaintiffs filed a motion for summary judgment on October 20. On November 18, Judge Childs issued a permanent injunction against enforcement of the same-sex marriage ban only to the extent that the state refused to recognize "valid marriages of same-sex couples entered into in other states or jurisdictions and otherwise meet the prerequisites for marriage in the State of South Carolina, except that they are of the same sex" or denied equal treatment to the same.

Condon v. Haley 
On October 8, 2014, Charleston County Probate Judge Irvin Condon, citing the ruling in Bostic, accepted a marriage license application presented by a lesbian couple, Colleen Condon and Nichols Bleckley, the first in the state. In other parts of the state, probate judges refused to accept marriage license applications pending a final decision in Bradacs. Attorney General Wilson filed Wilson v. Condon, requesting an emergency injunction from the South Carolina Supreme Court to halt the issuance of marriage licenses to same-sex couples. On October 9, the state Supreme Court agreed to halt the issuance of licenses pending the resolution of Bradacs. Because a South Carolina couple cannot receive a marriage license until 24 hours after their marriage license application was accepted, no marriage licenses were issued to same-sex couples in South Carolina during this time. On October 15, 2014, citing Bostic, Condon and Bleckley, represented by Lambda Legal and SC Equality, filed suit in federal district court seeking the right to marry. The defendants included Governor Haley, Attorney General Wilson, and Judge Condon, the state judge who was enjoined from licensing same-sex marriages a week earlier by the South Carolina Supreme Court. On November 12, U.S. District Judge Richard Gergel ruled for the plaintiffs and stayed his decision until noon on November 20. The Fourth Circuit Court of Appeals denied the state's request for a stay pending appeal or a temporary stay on November 18. Attorney General Wilson asked Chief Justice John Roberts, as Circuit Justice for the Fourth Circuit, for an emergency stay pending appeal later that day. He made an argument other states in similar cases had not made to the Supreme Court, that the principle of federalism known as the "domestic relations exception"–which restricts the role of federal courts in certain areas reserved to the states–required clarification. Justice Roberts referred the request to the full court, which denied it on November 20, with Justices Antonin Scalia and Clarence Thomas dissenting.

On the morning of November 19, 2014, Judge Condon began to issue marriage licenses to those who had applied prior to the state Supreme Court's order. Kayla Bennett and Kristin Anderson held their marriage ceremony outside of the Charleston County Probate Court, marking the state's first licensed same-sex marriage. Some probate courts began processing marriage license applications for same-sex couples on November 19, and more of them on November 20. Lexington County Probate Judge Daniel Eckstrom announced on November 20 that his county would continue to deny marriage licenses to same-sex couples "until this matter is conclusively resolved" or he is ordered to do so. The county reversed itself that same day and began to issue marriage licenses.

On December 1, Wilson asked the Fourth Circuit to suspend proceedings in Condon pending U.S. Supreme Court action on writs of certiorari on other same-sex marriage cases from the Sixth Circuit Court of Appeals. He told the court that he would be submitting a request for certiorari before judgment in Condon as well and that the other parties to this case did not object to his request. On December 16, the Fourth Circuit consolidated Bradacs and Condon as Bleckley v. Wilson and put proceedings on hold pending action by the U.S. Supreme Court on certiorari petitions. On June 26, 2015, the U.S. Supreme Court ruled in Obergefell v. Hodges that same-sex couples have a fundamental right to marry under the Due Process and Equal Protection clauses of the Fourteenth Amendment. The decision legalized same-sex marriage nationwide in the United States. In August 2015, Judge Gergel ordered Wilson in his official capacity as Attorney General to pay more than $134,000 in attorney's fees to the plaintiffs who successfully challenged the state's ban on same-sex marriage.

Swicegood v. Thompson
On March 13, 2014, Cathy Swicegood filed for divorce from Polly Thompson in a state trial court, alleging that they were common-law married. Swicegood and Thompson had been together for 13 years, shared a home, bank accounts and other property, and Swicegood was also covered under Thompson's health insurance plan. The lawsuit asked that a judge officially recognize Swicegood's union with Thompson and order that their joint property be equitably divided. Thompson filed a motion to dismiss for lack of subject-matter jurisdiction because the parties were not married and lacked the capacity to marry at the time. A family court dismissed Swicegood's action on May 7, 2014, ruling that a common-law marriage between two persons of the same sex was not legally possible according to state statutes. Swicegood appealed. In an unpublished opinion, the South Carolina Court of Appeals later remanded the case back to the family court with instructions to "consider the implications of Obergefell on its subject-matter jurisdiction". The family court ruled upon remand that the couple could not have formed a common-law marriage because the state's same-sex marriage ban was in place throughout the couple's 13 years together. The Court of Appeals affirmed the lower court's decision upon appeal on July 1, 2020, determining that South Carolina prohibited same-sex couples from "forming the requisite intent to be married at common-law" prior to the November 2014 decision in Condon. On November 10, 2021, the South Carolina Supreme Court, basing its reasoning on Obergefell, which held that state same-sex marriage bans are void ab initio, dispensed with briefing and vacated the provision of the Court of Appeals' opinion that same-sex couples could not form common-law marriages prior to November 2014. However, because Swicegood did not hold herself out as married during the times she lived with Thompson, the Supreme Court upheld the finding that no common-law marriage existed. South Carolina prospectively abolished common-law marriage in 2019 in Stone v. Thompson.

Developments after legalization
In January 2016, a group of five Republican lawmakers and one Democrat introduced the South Carolina Natural Marriage Defense Act to the General Assembly. The bill sought to prohibit state officials from marrying same-sex couples and require the Attorney General to defend any official who is sued or ordered by a federal judge to issue marriage licenses to same-sex couples, and thus would have been in violation of the U.S. Constitution. The bill died without any legislative action. A similar bill was introduced and subsequently defeated in Tennessee that same year. On February 15, 2018, six Republican lawmakers introduced the Marriage and Constitution Restoration Act to the General Assembly. The bill died without any legislative action on May 10, 2018, when the Assembly adjourned sine die. Had the bill been approved, it would have defined marriage as a "union between a man and a woman", declared all same-sex marriages "parody marriages" and prohibited the state from recognizing such "parody marriages". The bill would have thus been in violation of Obergefell v. Hodges, the 2015 Supreme Court ruling which found that same-sex couples have a constitutional right to marry, as well as the U.S. Constitution, which the lawmakers took an oath to uphold.

During an October 2022 gubernatorial debate, Governor Henry McMaster said that he would enforce a same-sex marriage ban in South Carolina if the U.S. Supreme Court were to overturn Obergefell v. Hodges, despite the majority of South Carolinians supporting same-sex marriage.

Native American nations
The federal court ruling does not apply to the Catawba Nation, which has jurisdiction over the marriages and divorces of tribal members, though members may still request a marriage license from their county clerk. It is unclear if same-sex marriage is legal on their reservation as tribal officials have not publicly commented on the issue. It is possible that the Catawba people traditionally allowed for marriages between two biological males through a two-spirit status, but a lot of traditional knowledge was lost in the aftermath of colonization, and so it is unknown if such two-spirit individuals were historically allowed to marry.

Demographics and marriage statistics
Data from the 2000 U.S. census showed that 7,609 same-sex couples were living in South Carolina. By 2005, this had increased to 10,563 couples, likely attributed to same-sex couples' growing willingness to disclose their partnerships on government surveys. Same-sex couples lived in all counties of the state and constituted 1.1% of coupled households and 0.6% of all households in the state. Most couples lived in Charleston, Greenville and Richland counties, but the counties with the highest percentage of same-sex couples were Allendale (0.79% of all county households) and Calhoun (0.73%). Same-sex partners in South Carolina were on average younger than opposite-sex partners, and more likely to be employed. However, the average and median household incomes of same-sex couples were lower than different-sex couples, and same-sex couples were also far less likely to own a home than opposite-sex partners. 21% of same-sex couples in South Carolina were raising children under the age of 18, with an estimated 3,370 children living in households headed by same-sex couples in 2005.

Richland County, home to the state capital of Columbia, had issued 422 marriage licenses to same-sex couples by June 26, 2016, one year after the Obergefell decision. In that same time period, Charleston County, South Carolina's third-most populous county, had issued 387 licenses to same-sex couples.

Public opinion 
An August 2011 Public Policy Polling (PPP) survey found that 21% of South Carolina voters thought same-sex marriage should be legal, while 69% thought it should be illegal and 10% were not sure. A separate question on the same survey found that 48% of South Carolina voters supported the legal recognition of same-sex couples, with 19% supporting same-sex marriage, 29% supporting civil unions but not marriage, 51% favoring no legal recognition and 2% not sure. A December 2012 PPP survey found that 27% of South Carolina voters thought same-sex marriage should be legal, while 62% thought it should be illegal and 10% were not sure. A separate question on the same survey found that 54% of South Carolina voters supported the legal recognition of same-sex couples, with 25% supporting same-sex marriage, 29% supporting civil unions but not marriage, 43% favoring no legal recognition and 4% not sure.

An October 2013 Winthrop University poll found that 38.5% of South Carolina adults thought same-sex marriage should be legal, while 52.2% thought it should be illegal and 6.1% were not sure. A February–March 2015 Winthrop University poll found that 42.8% of adult respondents thought same-sex marriage should be legal, while 52.7% thought it should be illegal.

A 2017 Public Religion Research Institute (PRRI) poll found that 53% of South Carolina residents supported same-sex marriage, while 37% were opposed and 10% were unsure. A PRRI survey conducted between January 7 and December 20, 2020 on 944 random telephone interviewees showed that 53% of respondents supported same-sex marriage, while 42% were opposed. A survey conducted by the same polling organization between March 8 and November 9, 2021 showed that 50% of respondents supported same-sex marriage, while 48% opposed.

See also 
 LGBT rights in South Carolina
 Same-sex marriage in the United States
 Politics of South Carolina

Notes

References

External links
Condon v. Haley, United States District Court for the District of South Carolina, November 12, 2014

LGBT in South Carolina
Politics of South Carolina
South Carolina
2014 in LGBT history
2014 in South Carolina